Mission Court is a bungalow court located at 567 N. Oakland Ave. in Pasadena, California. The court consists of eight buildings containing fourteen residential units which surround a central courtyard. Built in 1913, the court was designed by architect J. F. Walker. The houses in the court were designed in the Mission Revival style; the court is the oldest Mission Revival bungalow court in Pasadena. The houses' designs feature broken parapets along the roofs and porches with either recessed arch entrances or tiled shed roofs. The courtyard includes two buttressed piers topped by lamps.

The court was added to the National Register of Historic Places on July 11, 1983.

References

External links

Bungalow courts
Houses in Pasadena, California
Houses completed in 1913
Houses on the National Register of Historic Places in California
National Register of Historic Places in Pasadena, California
Mission Revival architecture in California
1913 establishments in California